The Big Fight is a 1930 American pre-Code drama film starring Lola Lane, Ralph Ince,  Guinn Williams and Stepin Fetchit, based upon the play by Max Marcin and Herbert Gropper, directed by Walter Lang, and released by Sono Art-World Wide Pictures.

Cast
 Lola Lane as Shirley
 Ralph Ince as Chuck
 Guinn "Big Boy" Williams as Tiger (billed as Guinn Williams)
 Stepin Fetchit as Spot
 Wheeler Oakman as Steve
 James Eagles as Lester (billed as James Eagle)
 Robert Emmett O'Connor as Detective (billed as Robert E. O'Connor)
 Frank Jonasson as Berrili

References

External links
 

1930 films
1930 drama films
1930 lost films
American drama films
American black-and-white films
1930s English-language films
Films directed by Walter Lang
Lost drama films
1930s American films